Lioré-et-Olivier was a French manufacturer of aircraft of the 20th century, founded in 1912  by Fernand Lioré and Henri Olivier.

History
The Société de Constructions Aéronautiques d'hydravions Lioré-et-Olivier had three factories, located in Argenteuil, Clichy, Hauts-de-Seine and Rochefort, Charente-Maritime.

The company was nationalized in 1936, following which it was merged with Chantiers aéronavals Étienne Romano, Potez, CAMS and SPCA in order to form the Société nationale des constructions aéronautiques du Sud-Est (SNCASE) on 1 February 1937. The factory at Rochefort, however, went into SNCASO.

Aircraft designs
 Lioré et Olivier LeO 1: Sopwith 1½ Strutter built under license.
 Lioré et Olivier LeO 3: fighter, 1917 (project).
 Lioré et Olivier LeO 4: reconnaissance aircraft, 1917 (project).
 Lioré et Olivier LeO 5:
 Lioré et Olivier LeO 6:
 Lioré et Olivier LeO 7: Bomber escort biplane, developed from the LeO 5, 1922.
 Lioré et Olivier LeO 7/2: Production version for the French Air Force.
 Lioré et Olivier LeO 7/3: Production version for the French Naval Aviation.
 Lioré et Olivier LeO 8: Two-seat reconnaissance aircraft and night fighter, 1923.
 Lioré et Olivier LeO 9:
 Liore et Olivier H.10: Prototype two-seat reconnaissance floatplane, 1923.
 Lioré et Olivier LeO 12: Night bomber prototype, 1924.
 Lioré et Olivier LeO 121: One LeO 12 converted into a 12-seat airliner.
 Lioré et Olivier LeO 122: Improved night bomber prototype, converted from an LeO 12.
 Lioré et Olivier LeO 123: One LeO 12 converted into a testbed with enclosed cockpits.
 Lioré et Olivier H.13: Biplane flying boat, 1922.
 Lioré et Olivier H.132: Powered by two Hispano-Suiza 8Aa engines.
 Lioré et Olivier H.133: Powered by two Renault 12F engines.
 Lioré et Olivier H.134: Powered by one Lorraine 12Eb engine.
 Lioré et Olivier H.135: Powered by two Hispano-Suiza 8Ab engines.
 Lioré et Olivier H.136: Version for Aeronavale.
 Lioré et Olivier H.14: Proposed 5-seat version of the H.13.
 Liore et Olivier H.15:
 Liore et Olivier H.18:
 Liore et Olivier H.19:
 Lioré et Olivier LeO 20: Night bomber aircraft, developed from the LeO 122, 1927.
 Lioré et Olivier LeO 201: Designation for parachute trainers converted from LeO 20.
 Lioré et Olivier LeO 203: Four-engine version of LeO 20.
 Lioré et Olivier LeO H.20/4: Floatplane version of LeO 203.
 Lioré et Olivier LeO 206: Production version of LeO 203.
 Lioré et Olivier LeO 207:   
 Lioré et Olivier LeO 208: as LeO 20 but with an enclosed cockpit and different engines.
 Lioré et Olivier LeO 21: Biplane airliner/military transport based on the LeO 20, 1929.
 Lioré et Olivier LeO 211:
 Lioré et Olivier LeO 212:
 Lioré et Olivier LeO 213: Production version.
 Lioré et Olivier LeO 214: Designation for LeO 213s converted into military transports for the French Air Force.
 Lioré et Olivier LeO 21S: Air ambulance based on the LeO 213.
 Liore et Olivier H.22:
 Liore et Olivier H.23: Amphibious reconnaissance flying boat
 Liore et Olivier H.24: Flying boat airliners.
 Lioré et Olivier H.242: Flying boat airliner, 1933.
 Lioré et Olivier H.242/1: Revised version of H.242 with a modified engine installation.
 Liore et Olivier H.246: Transport flying boat, 1939.
 Lioré et Olivier LeO 25: Bomber developed from the LeO 20, 1928.
 Lioré et Olivier LeO 252: Landplane bomber converted from LeO 25.
 Lioré et Olivier LeO 253: Landplane bomber similar to LeO 252.
 Lioré et Olivier LeO H.254: Seaplane version of LeO 252.
 Lioré et Olivier LeO H.255: Record-setting version of H.254.
 Lioré et Olivier LeO H.256: As H.254 except with lengthened wingspan.
 Lioré et Olivier LeO H.257: Modified H.254 for Aeronavale.
 Lioré et Olivier LeO H.257bis: Production version of H.257.
 Lioré et Olivier LeO H.258: Interim version similar to H.257bis for Aeronavale while H.257bis production was being undertaken.
 Lioré et Olivier LeO 259: Version powered by Hispano-Suiza 12Y engines.
 Liore et Olivier H.27:
 Lioré et Olivier LeO 30:
 Lioré et Olivier LeO 40: Experimental biplane, 1932.
 Lioré et Olivier LeO 41: Experimental biplane, 1932.
 Liore et Olivier H.43: Reconnaissance seaplane, 1934.
 Lioré et Olivier LeO 45: Designation for the LeO 451 prototype.
 Liore et Olivier H.47: Flying boat airliner/maritime patrol aircraft, 1936.
 Liore et Olivier H.470: Improved version of H.47. 
 Lioré et Olivier LeO 48:
 Liore et Olivier H.49: Flying boat airliner, 1942. Produced as the SNCASE SE.200.
 Liore et Olivier H.180: Two-seat flying boat, 1928.
 Liore et Olivier H.181: H.180 with an enclosed cockpit, 1929.
 Liore et Oliver H.190: Flying boat airliner, 1926.
 Lioré et Olivier LeO 300:
 Lioré et Olivier LeO 451:

References

External links

Defunct aircraft manufacturers of France
Manufacturing companies established in 1912
Manufacturing companies disestablished in 1937
French companies established in 1912
1937 disestablishments in France
Defence companies of France
1937 mergers and acquisitions